Transport in Sri Lanka is based on its road network, which is centred on the country's commercial capital Colombo. A rail network handles a portion of Sri Lanka's transport needs.

Road 
Roads account for about 93 percent of Sri Lanka's land transport. The main modes of transportation in Sri Lanka are bus, motorcycles and passenger cars (including taxi service).

Classification 

Sri Lanka's roads are graded E, A, B and C.

Expressways 

The Colombo–Matara Expressway is a  motorway linking Colombo, Galle and Matara which was built in 2011 to develop the economy of the Southern Province. The Colombo–Katunayake Expressway, Colombo-Kandy Expressway and Outer Circular Expressway (Colombo bypass road) are under construction, and a Colombo–Padeniya expressway has been proposed. The Sri Lankan government has proposed three elevated highways connecting the three main expressways:
 From Kirulapone to Kadawatha (about 19 km), connecting the Outer Circular Expressway at Kadawatha and the Colombo–Katunayake Expressway at Peliyagoda
 From Colombo Fort to Kottawa (about 21 km), connecting the Colombo–Matara and Outer Circular Expressways at Kottawa
 From Colombo Fort to the Peliyagoda interchange on the Colombo–Katunayake Expressway (about 5 km)

National highways 

Sri Lanka's national highways are graded A or B. A-Grade roads are subdivided as AA, AB or AC.

Road density is highest in the southwest, particularly the area around Colombo. Highways are in good condition, with a smooth bitumen surface and road markings; however, some rural roads are in poor condition. Heavily travelled roads are being upgraded and repaved. Public transport is widely available in many rural areas.

Buses 

Buses are the principal mode of public transport. Service is provided by the state-run Sri Lanka Transport Board (SLTB) and privately owned buses. The SLTB has urban and rural routes; in many rural areas, it provides service which would be unprofitable for private operators.

Colombo has an extensive, bus-based public transport system, with the Central Bus Stand in Pettah as its hub. The city's road network consists of radial links (or arterial routes), which link the city and district centres, and orbital links intersecting the arterial routes. Most bus routes are on the radial links, without dedicated bus lanes due to high peak traffic volume.  A BRT system for Colombo has been proposed but not yet implemented.

Inter-city routes connect many of the country's major population centres. Some service is available on the E01 and E03 expressways, with modern Lanka Ashok Leyland buses.

In 2011, the SLTB began introducing new buses to replace part of its aging fleet. The Volvo 8400 buses, from Volvo India, run on major routes in Colombo. The most popular model is the Lanka Ashok Leyland Viking, which is operated by the SLTB and several private companies.

Automobiles 
Sri Lanka modern transportation dates back 120 years, to 1902. When the first ever car entered Sri Lanka 8 HP single cylinder Rover brought down by Edgar Money, a local British businessman. Road at the time were barely build and linked only a few key towns around the island. Prior to 1960s, British and European car brands such as Ford, Mini, Rolls-Royce and Rover dominated the post-colonial Sri Lanka automobile market. Purchasing an automobile was once a luxury reserved for the upper crust of society, as vehicle imports was closely regulated, and taxes exorbitant. In the 1960s, there was an abrupt halt to the influx of vehicles to Sri Lanka when the Government ban all imports in order to fix a foreign exchange deficit. However, there have been various car assembly efforts since the 1980s. Upali Corporation assembled Fiat and Mazda vehicle. However, by the mid-1980s, it was finished.

Rail 

Sri Lanka Railways consists of an intercity network connecting major population centres and commuter rail serving Colombo commuters. Colombo is its hub. Trains connect the main cities of the country's nine provinces.

Most of the railways were developed during the British colonial period, with the first line (from Colombo to Kandy) opening on 26 April 1867. The railway was introduced as an economical means of transporting goods produced on the tea, rubber and coconut plantations to the main port in Colombo. After 1950s, the Sri Lankan economy became focused on industry rather than plantation agriculture. The road network also grew; with the introduction of lorries, a faster means of transporting goods, the amount of goods transported by rail declined. Since their network is more focused on plantation areas than on population and service centres, the railways have generated large losses.

Their potential for expansion was demonstrated when Minister of Transport Leslie Goonewardene extended the coastal line from Puttalam to Aruvakalu in 1974 to serve the cement factory there. The railway is modernising and extending that line to facilitate faster trains and improved efficiency. Electrification of the network's busiest sections was proposed in 2010 to improve energy efficiency and sustainability, but no work was done. The railway is extending the coastal line from Matara to Kataragama via Hambantota.

The Sri Lankan rail network passes scenic landscapes—particularly the Colombo-Badulla main line, which hugs the country's steep highlands. The railways connect the cities of Kandy, Galle, Matara, Jaffna, Kankesanturai, Mannar, Anuradhapura, Gampaha, Negombo, Kurunegala, Avissawella, Kalutara, Polonnaruwa, Batticaloa, Trincomalee, Badulla, Gampola, Nawalapitiya, Matale, Vavuniya, Puttalam and Chilaw with Colombo.

The narrow-gauge Kelani Valley Line, from Colombo to Avissawella, was converted to  broad gauge. The other narrow-gauge lines, from Nanu Oya to Nuwara Eliya, Avissawella to Yatiyantota and Avissawella to Ratnapura and Opanayaka, were dismantled due to financial losses. In 2007, the Sri Lankan government announced plans for Matara-Kataragama (113 km), Padukka-Hambantota-Ratnapura (210 km), Kurunegala-Dambulla-Habarana (80 km) and Panadura-Horana (18 km) lines by 2014.

Air

SriLankan Airlines 
SriLankan Airlines is Sri Lanka's national airline. Founded in 1979 as Air Lanka, the airline changed its name when it received partial foreign ownership in 1998. It operates to Asia and Europe from its base at Bandaranaike International Airport in Colombo; the airline's main office is in the Airline Centre at the airport. The airline was scheduled to join the Oneworld alliance in 2013.

SriLankan Airlines flies to 62 destinations in 34 countries.

Airports 
As of 27 March 2022 the oldest airport and the first international airport which is Ratmalana International Airport at Ratmalana resumed international travel and declared open for the public after 55 years. The Colombo International Airport which is in Katunayake, north of Colombo is the second international airport  which was declared open for the public after Ratmalana International Airport ceased international travel in 1967 and was the only international airport in operation for 46 years. The airport was renamed in 1995. Mattala Rajapaksa International Airport is in Mattala, north of Hambantota was the third international airport declared open for the public in March 2013. Jaffna International Airport became Sri Lanka's fourth international airport on 17 October 2019 when it was declared open for the public.

Domestic flights 
Domestic operators are Cinnamon Air, FitsAir, Helitours, Senok, and Simplifly. Sri Lanka has 19 airports.

Water
Sri Lanka has  of inland waterways (primarily on rivers in the southwest), navigable by shallow-draught boats.

Ports and harbours

Colombo Port 

Sri Lanka has deep-water ports at Colombo, Hambantota, Galle and Trincomalee. Colombo has the highest cargo volume, with an estimated capacity of 5.7 million TEUs. The port began a large-scale expansion project at a cost of US$1.2 billion in 2008 to increase its capacity and capabilities. The project, headed by the Sri Lanka Ports Authority and built by the Hyundai Engineering and Construction Company, was expected to be completed by 11 April 2012. It consists of four new  terminals which can accommodate three berths each, alongside a depth of 18 m (59 ft) (which can be deepened to 23 m [75 ft]). The project was expected to increase the annual container-handling capacity to about 12 million TEUs and accommodate 12,000-TEU container vessels.

Hambantota Port 
Construction of Magampura Mahinda Rajapaksa Port (also known as the Port of Hambantota) began in January 2008. It will be Sri Lanka's second-largest port, after Colombo. The first phase of the port will consist of two  general-purpose berths, a  bunkering berth and a  small-craft berth. The port will also contain a bunkering facility and tank farm, which will include eight tanks for marine fuel and three tanks each for aviation fuel and liquefied petroleum gas (LPG). A 15-floor administrative complex will also be constructed as part of the project. Later phases will raise the port's annual capacity to 20 million TEUs, making it the largest port constructed on land in the 21st century.

Dikkowitta Fishery Harbour 
The Dikkowitta Fishery Harbour, near Colombo in Wattala, Gampaha, Western Province, will cost an estimated $73 million and is projected to be Asia's largest fishing harbour. With unloading and packing facilities meeting the requirements of fish-importing countries (the EU, Japan and the US), it will be an alternative site for the Mutwal fishery harbour.
Facilities will include a southern basin for export-oriented fishing vessels, a northern basin for local fishing vessels, a service facility for boat repairs, cleaning and lifting and a fish-processing facility with three cold rooms.

Kankesanthurai Port 
The harbour at Kankesanturai, north of Jaffna, is navigable by ships of relatively shallow draught and was inactive during the civil war. The port is being restored and deepened with Indian aid.

Merchant marine 
In 2010, Sri Lanka had 21 ships ( or over), totalling 192,190 GT and (: four bulk carriers, 13 cargo ships, one chemical tanker, one container ship and two petroleum tankers.

Pipelines 
In 1987, Sri Lanka had  of pipelines for crude oil and petroleum products.

See also 

 Sri Lanka Railways
 Sri Lanka Transport Board
 Road signs in Sri Lanka
 Highway museum complex, Kiribathkumbura
 List of railway stations in Sri Lanka
 National railway museum, Kadugannawa

References

External links 

 Sri Lanka Railways official site (English, Sinhala, Tamil)
 Sri Lanka Railways Forum (timetable, news, books, images)